Coon may refer to:

Fauna

Butterflies
 Coon, common name of the butterfly Astictopterus jama
 Coon, species group of the butterfly genus Atrophaneura, now genus Losaria
 Coon, common name of the butterfly Psolos fuligo

Mammals
 Coon, an alternative name for Maine Coon, a breed of domestic cat
 Coon, a diminutive of raccoon

People 
 Coon (surname)
 Coön, a Trojan warrior who during the Trojan War wounded Agamemnon

Arts and entertainment
 "Coon 2: Hindsight", a 2010 episode of American animated series South Park
 "The Coon", a 2009 episode of American animated series South Park
 Coon Can or Conquian, a card game

Slang 
 Coon, a racial slur, used pejoratively to refer to a dark-skinned person of African, Australian First Nations, or Pacific island heritage.
 Coon Carnival, the original name for the Kaapse Klopse, a yearly minstrel festival in Cape Town, South Africa
 Coon Chicken Inn, a former American restaurant chain whose trademarks and entrances were designed to look like a smiling blackface caricature of an African-American porter
 Coon song, a genre of music that presented a stereotyped image of black people
 Coonass or Coon-ass, an epithet used in reference to a person of Cajun ethnicity

Other uses 
 Coon cheese, an Australian brand of cheese
 Coon hunting, a shortened form of the sport of raccoon hunting

See also 
 Coons (disambiguation)
 Coone (born 1983), a Belgian hardstyle musician and DJ
 Coonhound, a type of scent hound
 Koon (disambiguation)